Ekti Katha is a Bengali album of the Indian singer Shreya Ghoshal, released in 1999 by Indian label Sagarika. The songs are Bengali versions of popular Hindi film songs.

Track listing

References

External links

Shreya Ghoshal albums
1999 albums
Filmi albums